Penny Morris may refer to:

Penny Morris, character in Fireman Sam
Penny Morris, character in Babes on Broadway